Mynydd Llangyndeyrn is a Site of Special Scientific Interest (SSSI) in Carmarthen & Dinefwr,  Wales, and a hill reaching 263 metres (863 feet), which is a Marilyn.

Mynydd Llangyndeyrn and the SSSI are located west of Drefach and north of Pontyberem.

The SSSI citation for Mynydd Llangyndeyrn specifies that it is "notable  as  one  of  the larger upland semi-natural areas left in south-west Wales which, unlike most others, remains lightly grazed." The site features marshy grassland, wet heath, and  dry heath, and hosts the marsh fritillary butterfly (Euphydryas aurinia).

See also
List of Sites of Special Scientific Interest in Carmarthen & Dinefwr

References

External links
SSSI Citation for Mynydd Llangyndeyrn
SSSI Citation Map for Mynydd Llangyndeyrn
Your Special Site and its Future - Mynydd Llangyndeyrn SSSI overview from Natural Resources Wales
Mynydd Llangyndeyrn SSSI marked on DEFRA's MAGIC Map

Sites of Special Scientific Interest in Carmarthen & Dinefwr